Milltown Football Club is a former Irish football club based in Belfast. It was founded in 1886 and was a founding member of the Irish Junior League in 1890, before joining the Irish Football League for the 1891-92 season. The club was excluded for the 1892-93 season as the League was reduced to six members., and it rejoined the Junior League, in which it played until it folded during the 1896-97 season. The team wore green shirts.

Honours

Intermediate honours
Irish Intermediate Cup: 1
1894-95

References

Defunct association football clubs in Northern Ireland
Defunct Irish Football League clubs
Association football clubs in Belfast
1886 establishments in Ireland
1897 disestablishments in Ireland
Former senior Irish Football League clubs
Association football clubs established in 1886
Association football clubs disestablished in 1897